Aisey may refer to several communes in France:
 Aisey-et-Richecourt, in the Haute-Saône department
 Aisey-sur-Seine, in the Côte-d'Or department